Dadal is a sum (district) of Khentii Province in eastern Mongolia. Dadal airfield, unpaved (code ZMDA) at Lat: 49.0124N, 111.509E, elevation 1024 m.

A major township of the Buryats people, a Mongol people, some of whom that migrated from what is now Russia around the time of the Russian Revolution. The town is made up mainly of neatly maintained log cabins. This is one of several regions of Mongolia claimed as the birthplace of Genghis Khan (Chinggis Khaan). Dadal is located just to the south of the huge Onon-Balj National Park. The area and its people are well described in Chapter 3 (p. 53) of Black Dragon River: A Journey Down the Amur River Between Russia and China.

References

Districts of Khentii Province